is the fifth studio album by Japanese idol duo Wink, released by Polystar on December 16, 1990. It features the singles "Yoru ni Hagurete (Where Were You Last Night)" (a cover of Ankie Bagger's 1989 song) and "New Moon ni Aimashou". Also included in the album are Japanese-language covers of Annica Burman's "I Can't Deny a Broken Heart", Kiss' "I Was Made for Lovin' You", Harold Payne's "We'll Be Together Someday", and The Cowsills' "The Rain, the Park & Other Things".

The album peaked at No. 10 on Oricon's albums chart and sold over 164,000 copies.

Track listing 
All lyrics are written by Neko Oikawa, except where indicated; all music is arranged by Satoshi Kadokura.

Charts

Footnotes

References

External links 
 
 
 

1990 albums
Wink (duo) albums
Japanese-language albums